The Ujjain Nagda Passenger is a passenger train of the Indian Railways, which runs between Ujjain Junction railway station of Ujjain, Holy city of Madhya Pradesh and Nagda Junction railway station of Nagada of Central Indian state Madhya Pradesh.

Arrival and departure

Train no.593530UP departs from Nagda, daily at 23:25 hrs., reaching Ujjain the same day at 01:00 hrs.
Train no.593549DN departs from Ujjain daily at 20:40 hrs. from platform no.3 reaching Nagda the next day at 22:15  hrs.

Route and halts

The important halts of the train are :
 Ujjain Junction railway station
 Naikheri railway station
 Aslaoda railway station
 Palsora Makrawa railway station
 Unhel railway station
 Piploda Bagla railway station
 Bhatisuda railway station
 Nagda Junction railway station

Coach composite

The train consists of 18 coaches:
 1 First Class
 4 Sleeper coaches
 10 Unreserved
 1 Ladies/Handicapped
 2 Luggage/Brake van

Average speed and frequency

The train runs with an average speed of 44 km/h and covers 44 km in 1 hour and 18 minutes. The train runs on a daily basis.

Loco link

The train is hauled by Ratlam RTM WDM-3 Diesel engine.

Rake maintenance & sharing

The train is maintained by the Ujjain Coaching Depot. The same rake is used for five trains, which are Indore–Chhindwara Panchvalley Express, Indore–Maksi Fast Passenger, Indore–Ujjain Passenger, Bhopal–Indore Passenger and Bhopal–Bina Passenger for one way which is altered by the second rake on the other way.

See also

Avantika Express
Indore Junction
Bhopal Junction

References

Railway services introduced in 1999
Rail transport in Madhya Pradesh
Slow and fast passenger trains in India
Transport in Ujjain